Goggia hewitti, known commonly as Hewitt's dwarf leaf-toed gecko, Hewitt's leaf-toed gecko,  or Hewitt's pygmy gecko, is a species of gecko, a lizard in the family Gekkonidae. The species is endemic to South Africa.

Etymology
The specific name, hewitti, is in honor of British-born South African herpetologist John Hewitt.

Description
The tail, if original, is slightly longer than the SVL, but shorter if regenerated. The dorsum of the body is light brown with darker brown markings, and the venter is pale cream. Males have four preanal pores.

Reproduction
G. hewitti is oviparous. The eggs, which measure , are laid under rock flakes. Clutch size is two.

References

Further reading
Bauer, Aaron M.; Good, David A.; Branch, William R. (1997). "The taxonomy of the southern African leaf-toed geckos (Squamata: Gekkkonidae), with a review of Old World "Phyllodactylus " and the description of five new genera". Proc. California Acad. Nat. Sci., Fourth Series 49: 447–497. (Goggia hewitti, new combination, p. 470).
Branch WR, Bauer AM, Good DA (1995). "Species limits in the Phyllodactylus lineatus complex (Reptilia: Gekkonidae), with the elevation of two taxa to specific status and the description of two new species". J. Herp. Assoc. Africa 44 (2): 33–54. (Phyllodactylus hewitti, new species).

Goggia
Reptiles described in 1995
Endemic reptiles of South Africa
Taxa named by William Roy Branch